Tiarella, the foamflowers, is a genus of flowering plants in the family Saxifragaceae. The generic name Tiarella means "little turban", which suggests the shape of the seed capsules. Worldwide there are seven species, one each in eastern Asia and western North America, plus five species in eastern North America. , the taxonomy of Tiarella in eastern North America is in flux.

Description

Plants of genus Tiarella are perennial, herbaceous plants with short, slender rhizomes. Three morphological features are used to distinguish Tiarella species: 1) presence or absence of stolons; 2) size and shape of basal leaves; and 3) presence or absence of stem leaves (also called cauline leaves). Two species of Tiarella have stolons (T. austrina, T. stolonifera) while two other species have stem leaves (T. nautila, T. austrina). Plants from the southern Blue Ridge Mountains and southward have relatively large basal leaves with an extended terminal lobe (T. austrina, T. nautila, T. wherryi).

The following identification key was published by Guy Nesom in 2021:

Taxonomy
In 1753, Swedish botanist Carl Linnaeus established genus Tiarella by recognizing two species, Tiarella cordifolia and Tiarella trifoliata. A third species, Tiarella polyphylla, was described by David Don in 1825. Together these three species form the taxonomic backbone of the genus. In 1840, in the first critical treatment of Tiarella since Linnaeus, John Torrey and Asa Gray described two new sections:

 Tiarella sect. Anthonema : flowering stem leafy with alternate leaves; flowers paniculate; petals filiform or subulate; western North America
 Tiarella sect. Eutiarella : flowering stem naked; flowers racemose; petals oblong with a small claw or stalk; eastern North America.

Olga Lakela highlighted the section names in 1937, but they have since fallen out of favor with botanists, mainly because Tiarella polyphylla is inconsistent with the dichotomy, but perhaps also because there are taxa with leafy flowering stems in both western and eastern North America.

In Asia, the genus is represented by one species (Tiarella polyphylla). In North America, there have been numerous major treatments of genus Tiarella, with taxonomies recognizing from two to six species, some including infraspecific taxa.

Currently accepted taxonomies are based on three sources:

 Tiarella polyphylla in Flora of China
 Tiarella trifoliata and related taxa in Flora of North America
 Tiarella cordifolia and related taxa in a paper published by Guy Nesom in 2021

The treatment in the first source is near-universally accepted, the second is widely recognized, while the third is new and growing in acceptance. A few authorities (with global scope) accept all three.

Infrageneric taxa
All names used in this section are taken from the International Plant Names Index, except where noted. The geographical locations are taken from Plants of the World Online (POWO). , POWO accepts 7 species and 3 infraspecies:

 Tiarella austrina : Alabama, Georgia, North Carolina, South Carolina, Tennessee
 Tiarella cordifolia  sensu stricto: Georgia, Maryland, North Carolina, South Carolina, Virginia
 Tiarella nautila : Georgia, North Carolina, Tennessee
 Tiarella polyphylla : Assam, China, East Himalaya, Japan, Korea, Myanmar, Nepal, Taiwan, Tibet
 Tiarella stolonifera : Connecticut, Kentucky, Maine, Maryland, Massachusetts, Michigan, New Brunswick, New Hampshire, New Jersey, New York, North Carolina, Nova Scotia, Ohio, Ontario, Pennsylvania, Québec, Rhode Island, Tennessee, Vermont, Virginia, West Virginia, Wisconsin
 Tiarella trifoliata 
 Tiarella trifoliata var. laciniata : British Columbia, Oregon, Washington
 Tiarella trifoliata var. trifoliata: Alaska, Alberta, British Columbia, California, Idaho, Montana, Oregon, Washington
 Tiarella trifoliata var. unifoliata : Alaska, Alberta, British Columbia, California, Idaho, Montana, Oregon, Washington
 Tiarella wherryi : Alabama, Georgia, Kentucky, Mississippi, Tennessee

Distribution
Tiarella is native to Asia and North America. It has been introduced into Norway.

Asia
Tiarella polyphylla is an Asian species, ranging from the eastern Himalayas to China, east Asia, and southeast Asia.

Western North America
In western North America, Tiarella trifoliata ranges from California northward to Alaska, and eastward to Montana. Within this region, the varieties of T. trifoliata have overlapping ranges.

Canada:

 Alberta: , 

United States:

 Alaska: , 
 California: , 
 Idaho: , 
 Montana: , 

Eastern North America
In eastern North America, Tiarella cordifolia sensu lato is wide ranging, from northeastern Wisconsin across southeastern Canada to Nova Scotia, extending southward through the Appalachians into Alabama and Mississippi. The range of Tiarella cordifolia sensu stricto is narrowly confined to the East Coast of the United States from Maryland through Virginia and the Carolinas into Georgia.

At least one species of Tiarella occurs in each of 26 provinces and states. Multiple species of Tiarella occur in eight (8) states. Tiarella stolonifera occurs in 22 provinces and states, it being the only species of Tiarella in 17 of those provinces and states. Tiarella cordifolia sensu stricto occurs in just five (5) states, all of which have at least two Tiarella species. The ranges of Tiarella nautila, Tiarella wherryi, and Tiarella austrina overlap in Tennessee, North Carolina, and Georgia.

Canada:

 New Brunswick: T. stolonifera
 Nova Scotia: T. stolonifera
 Ontario: T. stolonifera
 Québec: T. stolonifera

United States:

 Alabama: T. austrina, T. wherryi
 Connecticut: T. stolonifera
 Georgia: T. austrina, T. cordifolia, T. nautila, T. wherryi
 Kentucky: T. stolonifera, T. wherryi
 Maine: T. stolonifera
 Maryland: T. cordifolia, T. stolonifera
 Massachusetts: T. stolonifera
 Michigan: T. stolonifera
 Mississippi: T. wherryi
 New Hampshire: T. stolonifera
 New Jersey: T. stolonifera
 New York: T. stolonifera
 North Carolina: T. austrina, T. cordifolia, T. nautila, T. stolonifera
 Ohio: T. stolonifera
 Pennsylvania: T. stolonifera
 Rhode Island: T. stolonifera
 South Carolina: T. austrina, T. cordifolia
 Tennessee: T. austrina, T. nautila, T. stolonifera, T. wherryi
 Vermont: T. stolonifera
 Virginia: T. cordifolia, T. stolonifera
 West Virginia: T. stolonifera
 Wisconsin: T. stolonifera

A disjunct population of Tiarella occurs in Stearns County, Minnesota but botanists believe it was introduced. That population is claimed to be T. stolonifera, but evidence is lacking.

Conservation
In western North America, Tiarella trifoliata is globally secure (G5). Each variety is globally secure as well.

In eastern North America, Tiarella cordifolia sensu lato is globally secure (G5). It is frequent to common throughout most of its wide distribution but becomes rare at the edges of its range, in Wisconsin and the western Upper Peninsula of Michigan, Nova Scotia, New Jersey, and Mississippi.

Cultivation
Many hybrids are known and cultivated. The following have been given the Royal Horticultural Society's Award of Garden Merit:
Tiarella  = 'Gowing'
Tiarella 'Spring Symphony'<ref>{{cite web | url = https://www.rhs.org.uk/Plants/166320/Tiarella-Spring-Symphony-(PBR)/Details | title = Tiarella 'Spring Symphony | publisher = RHS | access-date = 5 March 2021}}</ref>Tiarella cordifoliaTiarella wherryi''

References

Bibliography

External links

 
 
 
 
 
 
 
 
 
 
 

Saxifragaceae
Saxifragaceae genera
Groundcovers